Jesus Alberto Zambrano Contreras (Jessus Zambrano) (born in Abejales, Táchira, Venezuela on December 22, 1989) is a Venezuelan model and actor who was selected Mister Venezuela in 2012. He obtained the title of Mister Venezuela 2012 after being chosen by local Mister World franchiseholder, Osmel Sousa. The next year he was know his starring role on the hit television series "Los Secretos de Lucia” which aired in 2013 to audiences around the world through Venevision Network.

Zambrano represented Venezuela at the Mister World 2013 pageant in Kent, England, on November 24, 2012,

Filmography

Television

References

Male beauty pageant winners
Living people
People from Caracas
Venezuelan male models
1989 births